Théodore Stauffer (29 May 1901 – 13 October 1971) was a Swiss boxer. He competed in the men's welterweight event at the 1924 Summer Olympics.

References

External links
 

1901 births
1971 deaths
Welterweight boxers
Swiss male boxers
Olympic boxers of Switzerland
Boxers at the 1924 Summer Olympics
Place of birth missing